Psilocybe sierrae is a species of mushroom in the family Hymenogastraceae. The mushroom contains the psychoactive compounds psilocybin and psilocin.  This species is found in Oregon, British Columbia and Chile.

See also
List of Psilocybin mushrooms
Psilocybin mushrooms
Psilocybe

References

Entheogens
Psychoactive fungi
sierraei
Psychedelic tryptamine carriers